John A. Litvack (May 25, 1945 – March 21, 2015) was an American television producer and media executive who was head of scheduling and programming for The WB Network and was an executive at CBS, NBC, MGM and Disney TV. He was called the "dean of current programming."

Biography 
Litvack was born in Newton, Massachusetts on May 25, 1945. He received a bachelor's degree from Columbia University in 1966 and began his television career as a cue-card holder for the children's television series Captain Kangaroo.

He worked his way up in the network, becoming a director of TV soap operas such as The Edge of Night, The Guiding Light, As the World Turns, and Search for Tomorrow, becoming director of daytime programs for CBS from 1975 to 1978. He was credited for credited with helping innovate the look of soap operas by making them look more cinematic.

From 1979 to 1981, Litvack was head of current programming at MGM Television. He was named VP of current drama at NBC in 1981 and supervised shows such as Hill Street Blues, The A-Team, Miami Vice, St. Elsewhere, and Remington Steele. From 1986 to 1987, he worked at MTM Productions. He joined Disney TV as senior VP of current programming in 1989, working with Garth Ancier and Jordan Levin. He oversaw the development of shows such as The Golden Girls and Home Improvement, and helped develop the show Boy Meets World. He also helped start the Archive of American Television during this time.

From 1997 to 2004, Litvack was EVP, head of scheduling and current programming at the WB Network. During that time, he oversaw the production of Dawson's Creek, Buffy The Vampire Slayer, 7th Heaven, Charmed, Felicity, Popular, Everwood and Smallville. He was credited by Variety for mentoring J.J. Abrams, Joss Whedon, Greg Berlanti how to run television series.

Litvack was a co-executive producer of Hill Street Blues, Smallville, and consulting producer of Fringe.

Personal life 
Litvack was the father of Cameron Litvack. He died on March 21, 2015, following surgery complications at age 69.

References 

American television producers
Columbia College (New York) alumni
American media executives
CBS people
Disney people
The WB executives
1945 births

2015 deaths